Endothenia nigricostana, the black-edged marble, is a moth of the family Tortricidae. It was described by Adrian Hardy Haworth in 1811. It is found from most of Europe, east to Japan. The habitat consists of woodland margins and embankments.

The wingspan is 11–15 mm. Adults are on wing from May to July.

The larvae feed on Stachys palustris, Stachys silvatica, and Lamium species. They eat down from the flower into the stem and roots.

References

Moths described in 1811
Endotheniini
Moths of Europe